In the run up to the 2011 Portuguese presidential election, various organisations carried out opinion polling to gauge voting intention in Portugal. Results of such polls are displayed in this article.

Poll results are listed in the table below in reverse chronological order, showing the most recent first. The highest percentage figure in each polling survey is displayed in bold, and the background shaded in the leading candidate colour. In the instance that there is a tie, then no figure is shaded but both are displayed in bold. Poll results use the date the survey's fieldwork was done, as opposed to the date of publication.

Candidates vote

First round

Graphical summary

Polling

External links 
 ERC - Official publication of polls

Opinion polling in Portugal